Wayne Perry may refer to:

Wayne M. Perry, National President of the Boy Scouts of America
Wayne Perry (country music) (died 2005), singer-songwriter
Wayne Perry (lawn bowls), South African lawn bowler

See also
 Perry (surname)